Hydrodynamic coupling may refer to:

fluid coupling
torque converter